De Olde Molen is a windmill in Palm Beach, Aruba. It was originally built in 1815 as a windpump in Winschoterzijl, Groningen, Netherlands. In 1897, it was moved to Wedderveer, Groningen where it served as a gristmill. In 1960, it was bought by Theo Paalman and G.J. Woudenberg, two Aruban businessmen, disassembled and rebuilt in Aruba. The windmill is home to a restaurant and a windmill museum. It is located next to the Bubali Bird Sanctuary.

History 
In 1804 a mill was constructed as a windpump in Winschoterzijl. The mill burnt down in 1814, and was rebuilt in 1815. In 1883, it was sold, and was relocated to Wedderveer, Groningen. In 1897, the windmill was rebuilt and functioned as a gristmill. During the Wedderveer period, the mill was also known as Molen van Snelter and Molen van Jonker. It remained in operation until 1939, and on 2 October 1958, the demolition was approved.

Theo Paalman and G.J. Woudenberg, two Aruban businessmen, bought the mill in 1960, and planned to move it to Aruba as a tourist landmark. De Olde Molen was carefully disassembled, and prepared for shipment in pieces except for the  blades which remained in one piece. The stone base was demolished, and a new base was constructed in Aruba for the restaurant.

In March 1961, the first stone was placed by Lieutenant Governor E.J.C. Beaujon. The rebuilding was supervised by Jan Medendorp, a Dutch windmill builder, who had been responsible for disassembling the windmill. To prevent damage by the strong trade winds on Aruba, the sails were fixed into place. In March 1962, construction was complete and the restaurant and mill museum opened. 

In 1973, De Olde Molen was sold to Joseph Patterson who restored the windmill, and decorated the restaurant with furniture and paintings dating between 880 and 1800. Medendorp returned to Aruba in 2001, and was disappointed, because the sails had been attached the wrong way, because the wheel should turn anticlockwise.

Gallery

References 

Windmills in Aruba
Buildings and structures in Noord
Windmills completed in 1815
Tourist attractions in Aruba
Windmills in Groningen (province)